"Unstoppable" is a song by Australian singer-songwriter Sia, taken from her seventh studio album This Is Acting (2016). The song was written by Sia and Christopher Braide, and produced by Jesse Shatkin. It was released as the album's final promotional single on 21 January 2016. In July 2016, a new version of the song was made for Gillette's 2016 Olympic ad campaign, "Pretty Isn't Perfect", which features a verse from American rapper Pusha T.

In July 2022, the song was issued to contemporary hit radio in the United States as an official single, after gaining success from usage as backing music on TikTok and in commercials. The song has accumulated prolonged success as a sleeper hit, garnering increasing attention over the course of six years, and reappeared on worldwide charts in the early 2020s.

Composition
"Unstoppable" is the fifth track on Sia's 2016 album This Is Acting. It has been called a "stomping, empowering jam" and "swollen self-esteem anthem of her", with lyrics like, "I'm unstoppable, I'm a Porsche with no brakes / I'm invincible, I win every single game / I'm so powerful I don't need batteries to play / I'm so confident yeah I'm unstoppable today."

Release and commercial use
Sia debuted "Unstoppable" on 20 January 2016, days before the album's 29 January release date. The song marked the sixth used to promote the album prior to its release. Major League Baseball used the song to promote the 2016 postseason as well as highlights.

In 2019, the song was used in the commercial for the Lancôme Idôle fragrance, which starred Zendaya. In 2022, "Unstoppable" was featured in a commercial for the Samsung Galaxy S22 Ultra.

Reception
"Unstoppable" has received mostly positive critical reception, with most reviewers commenting on its theme of empowerment. Jessie Morris of Complex commented that the song sounds like a "page torn right out of Demi Lovato's Confident book", while editors of other media platforms like Idolator noticed this as well, which raised speculation that the track was intentionally written for Lovato. Billboard Jessica Katz said the song is reminiscent of work by Rihanna and "clearly follows in the lineage of emotional barn-burners that have become [Sia's] trademark". Michelle Lulic of Bustle said its lyrics "make it clear is the female empowerment anthem you had no idea you were missing from your life. Seriously, if you need a song to get you through the rest of the work week... and this is the song you've been waiting for." Furthermore, Lulic wrote, "While ... the song was not initially written for [Sia], it certainly doesn't take away from [her] ability to handle the powerful ballad and catchy lyrics. Because, honestly, if it was Rihanna, Adele, or even Katy Perry singing this song, it still wouldn't lose its powerful message."

MTV's Emilee Lindner said it "encourages those who are feeling weak to put their armor on". Furthermore, she wrote, "The song seems like it's taking the message from her previously released track, 'Alive', and giving it a boost. Instead of just surviving, she's going to prove to people that she's going to succeed, and she's going to look good doing it." Daniel Kreps of Rolling Stone called the song "triumphant", with a "fist-pumping, wall-smashing" chorus. Stereogums Tom Breiham, who wrote about the song after its debut but before This Is Acting release, guessed that Sia wrote "Unstoppable" with a recording artist like Katy Perry in mind. He compared the song to the work of Florence and the Machine.

Commercial performance
On the Billboard Hot 100, the song debuted at number 98 six years after being released, and peaked at number 28, becoming Sia's eighth top 40 hit on the chart.

Track listing
Digital download – The Remixes
 "Unstoppable" – 3:47
 "Unstoppable" (Clarence Clarity remix) – 3:37
 "Unstoppable" (R3Hab remix) – 2:42
 "Unstoppable" (Slowed & Reverb) – 4:12
 "Unstoppable" (Sped up) – 3:17

Charts

Weekly charts

Year-end charts

Certifications

References

2016 songs
2022 singles
Number-one singles in Russia
RCA Records singles
Sia (musician) songs
Song recordings produced by Jesse Shatkin
Songs with feminist themes
Songs written by Chris Braide
Songs written by Sia (musician)
2010s ballads